Peabody Township is a township in Marion County, Kansas, United States.  As of the 2010 census, the township population was 1,382, including most of the city of Peabody.

Geography

Cities and towns
The township contains the following settlements:
 City of Peabody (south of 9th Street).  A small north part of Peabody is located in Catlin Township.

Cemeteries
The township contains the following cemeteries:
 No cemeteries.  The Prairie Lawn Cemetery for the city of Peabody is located in Catlin Township.

Transportation
Two railroads, BNSF Railway and Union Pacific Railroad, pass through the township.  The BNSF Railway runs northeast to southwest through the township.  The Oklahoma Kansas Texas (OKT) line of the Union Pacific Railroad runs north to south through the township.

U.S. Route 50 passes along the northern township edge, and follows roughly parallel to the BNSF Railway.

References

Further reading

External links
 Marion County website
 City-Data.com
 Marion County maps: Current, Historic, KDOT

Townships in Marion County, Kansas
Townships in Kansas